

References

Additional sources
 
 

M